Arnicratea is a genus of flowering plants belonging to the family Celastraceae.

Its native range is Tropical Asia.

Species:

Arnicratea cambodiana 
Arnicratea ferruginea

References

Celastraceae
Celastrales genera